Agnete Bræstrup (7 October 1909 – 11 July 1992) was a Danish physician. She founded Foreningen for Familieplanlægning (Association for Family Planning) in 1956, which is now known as Sex & Samfund (Sex & Society), a non-profit organization responsible for providing sex education in Denmark.

References

Bibliography 
 
 

1909 births
1992 deaths
People from Copenhagen
Danish women physicians
Danish educators
Danish women educators
20th-century Danish physicians
20th-century women physicians
German emigrants to Denmark